Events of May may refer to:
 The student uprisings of May 1968 in France
 Barcelona May Days the fighting that broke out in Barcelona between the communists and their allies during the Spanish Civil War
 The Bava Beccaris massacre in May 1898 in Milan, Italy.